Living Dolls is an American sitcom featured on the fall 1989 schedule of ABC.  It was a spin-off created by a writer from Who's the Boss? and featuring characters introduced during an episode of that show. The show was the acting debut of Halle Berry. Both Who's the Boss? and Living Dolls were produced by ELP Communications through Columbia Pictures Television and ABC.

Synopsis
The show featured Charlie Briscoe (Leah Remini), a friend of Samantha Micelli (the Who's the Boss? character played by Alyssa Milano). Samantha is dabbling in a modeling career and Charlie, a friend from Samantha's old Brooklyn neighborhood, comes to visit. While doing some test shots for a dog food commercial, it is discovered that Charlie is very photogenic. Charlie is then befriended by the owner of a modeling agency for teenage girls, Trish Carlin (Michael Learned). Trish is also a friend of advertising executive Angela Bower, one of the main characters on Who's the Boss? Trish becomes a mother figure to Charlie and the other models.

Reception
Living Dolls was panned by critics and received mostly negative reviews. It was the only series to receive an "F" grade by People magazine in its 1989 fall preview issue. ABC canceled the series after 12 episodes in December 1989.

Production
The series began as a back-door pilot on Who's the Boss? In that episode, Vivica A. Fox played Emily instead of Halle Berry, and Jonathan Ward portrayed Rick, who came to be known as Eric when David Moscow took over the role for the series. Executives disliked the original cast and held auditions for recasting. The Who's the Boss pilot first aired in March, but it was rerun directly before the Living Dolls premiere, illustrating the reasons why Charlie moved in with Trish in the first place.

Cast
Michael Learned as Miss Patricia "Trish" Carlin
Leah Remini as Charlene "Charlie" Briscoe
Deborah Tucker as Caroline Weldon
Alison Elliott as Martha Lambert
Halle Berry as Emily Franklin
David Moscow as Eric "Rick" Carlin

Episodes

References

External links

1989 American television series debuts
1989 American television series endings
1980s American sitcoms
American Broadcasting Company original programming
English-language television shows
Modeling-themed television series
American television spin-offs
Television series by Sony Pictures Television
Television shows set in New York City